Simplicala is a genus of moths of the family Noctuidae erected by Herbert Beck in 1996. Lepidoptera and Some Other Life Forms gives this name as a synonym of Catocala.

References

Catocalinae